Pickering—Scarborough East was a provincial electoral district in Ontario, Canada, that was represented in the Legislative Assembly of Ontario between 2007 and 2018.

The district was created in 2003 from 44.1% of Pickering—Ajax—Uxbridge, 39.7% of Scarborough East, and 0.1% of Scarborough—Rouge River ridings.

The district consisted of the southwest part of the city of Pickering and the southeast part of the Scarborough district of Toronto.

Specifically, it consisted of the part of the City of Pickering lying south and west of a line drawn from the western city limit east along Finch Avenue, south along Valley Farm Road, northeast along Highway 401 and south along Brock Road to the southern city limit; and the part of the City of Toronto lying south and east of a line drawn from the eastern city limit west along Finch Avenue East, south along Meadowvale Road, west along Sheppard Avenue East, south along Morningside Avenue and southeast along Highland Creek to Lake Ontario.

In 2018, the district was dissolved into Pickering—Uxbridge and Scarborough—Rouge Park.

Demographics
(According to the Canada 2006 Census)

Ethnic groups: 61.3% White, 13.5% South Asian, 10.4% Black, 4.1% Filipino, 3.2% Chinese  
Languages: 74.6% English, 1.3% French, 23.9% Other 
Average income: $31 920

Members of Provincial Parliament

Election results

2007 electoral reform referendum

Sources

Elections Ontario Past Election Results

Former provincial electoral districts of Ontario
Pickering, Ontario
Provincial electoral districts of Toronto
Scarborough, Toronto